Khvajeh Beyg (also Romanized as Khvājeh Beyg and Khvājeh Beyk) is a village in Bakharz Rural District, in the Central District of Bakharz County, Razavi Khorasan Province, Iran. At the 2006 census, its population was 84, in 23 families.

References 

Populated places in Bakharz County